Phil Haynes (born October 19, 1995) is an American football offensive guard for the Seattle Seahawks of the National Football League (NFL). He played college football at Wake Forest.

Early life and high school
Haynes grew up in Raleigh, North Carolina and initially attended North Raleigh Christian Academy. Also spent time in LA.Starting out as a basketball player, a local insurance broker funded his scholarship to play basketball for the Knights. He transferred to Virginia Episcopal School in Lynchburg, Virginia after his junior year in order to re-classify and gain an extra season of eligibility. He joined the football team at Virginia Episcopal and attracted the attention of college recruiters, ultimately committing to play college football at Wake Forest despite only playing one year of football. Since he had already reclassified as a junior, Haynes moved back to Raleigh and took extra courses at William G. Enloe High School in order to enter Wake Forest with his original class.

College career
Haynes spent five total seasons as a member of the Wake Forest Demon Deacons, redshirting his true freshman season. He started at right tackle as a redshirt freshman before moving to left guard for his final three seasons. He was named third-team All-Atlantic Coast Conference (ACC) after his redshirt junior season and entered his redshirt senior year on the 2018 Outland Trophy watchlist. Over the course of his collegiate career, Haynes started 47 games for the Demon Deacons.

Professional career

Haynes was drafted by the Seattle Seahawks in the fourth round (124th overall) of the 2019 NFL Draft. He was placed on the reserve/PUP list to start the season while recovering from sports hernia surgery. Hayes was activated from the PUP list on November 5, 2019. After not appearing in a game during the regular season, Haynes made his NFL debut on January 5, 2020, in a 17-9 win in the Wildcard round of the postseason against the Philadelphia Eagles.

On September 7, 2020, Haynes was placed on injured reserve. He was activated on November 18, 2020. He was placed back on injured reserve on December 24, 2020.

On September 1, 2021, Haynes was waived by the Seahawks and re-signed to the practice squad. He was promoted to the active roster on November 27.

On March 12, 2022, the Seahawks placed an original-round restricted free agent tender on Haynes, which he signed on April 19.

Haynes signed a one-year contract extension with the Seahawks on February 21, 2023.

References

External links
Wake Forest Demon Deacons bio

1995 births
Living people
Players of American football from Raleigh, North Carolina
American football offensive guards
Wake Forest Demon Deacons football players
Seattle Seahawks players